Saint-Germain-lès-Corbeil (literally Saint-Germain near Corbeil) is a commune in the Essonne department in Île-de-France in northern France.

Population
Inhabitants of Saint-Germain-lès-Corbeil are known as Saint-Germinois in French.

See also
Communes of the Essonne department

References

External links

Official website 
Mayors of Essonne Association 

Communes of Essonne